Wulu railway station (Simplified Chinese: 五路火车站; Pinyin: Wǔlù Huǒchēzhàn) is a railway station in Haidian District, Beijing, China. It is the east terminus of Jingmen Railway since 1971, when the line was abandoned between Wulu and Beijing North railway station.

The Station is currently for freight traffic only, and only sees light traffic since early 2000s.

The station has a branch line which connects Xijiao Airport, which supposedly provides fuel supply for the airport. As a result, one may see tank cars in the station, although only on rare occasions.

It is worth noting that Wulu railway station is of walking distance from Haidian Wuluju station, a station on Beijing Subway Line 6. It is also in proximity of West 4th Ring Road.

Railway stations in Haidian District